College Girl is a 1990 Bollywood movie starring Amita Nangia, Pankaj Berry, Veerendra Singh, Pramod Moutho, Ajit Vachani, Sudhir Pandey, Vidyashree and Rajani Bala. The movie was directed by Surendra Gupta.

Plot
Madhuri, Vicky and Aakash study together in college. Vicky, whose father is a minister, tries to woo her, but she falls for Aakash. Vicky introduces her to drugs through another girl. She becomes an addict. Aakash contests against Vicky in the student elections and wins. Furious, Vicky rapes Madhuri. 
Madhuri's brother Niranjan is reluctant to file a police complaint due to social fear. Her sister-in-law (Rekha), however, decides to go to the police when Aakash assures that he will  stand by Madhuri. 
The police inspector tips off the minister before registering the case. The minister tries to persuade Rekha not to go ahead with the complaint, but she refuses. He brutally rapes Rekha in her bedroom and get both her and her husband killed. The court too absolves Vicky of the charge. Madhuri, with the help of Aakash, takes revenge by taking on Vicky, the minister and their accomplices, one by one.

Cast

Amita Nangia as Madhuri
Pankaj Berry as Vicky
Virendra Singh (actor) as Akash
Sudhir Pandey as Digvijay Singh, the minister (Vicky's father)
Ajit Vachhani as Inspector Salunke
Pramod Moutho as Niranjan (Madhuri's brother)
Vidyashree as Rekha (Madhuri's Bhabhi)
Tiku Talsania
Shreechand Makhija as Sinha, Digvijay Singh Secretary
Rajni Bala    
Jay Kalgutkar as Rang Raj
Manmauji

References

External links

1990 films
1990s Hindi-language films
Films scored by Babul Bose